The 1996 Cork Intermediate Hurling Championship was the 87th staging of the Cork Intermediate Hurling Championship since its establishment by the Cork County Board in 1909. The draw for the opening fixtures took place on 10 December 1995. The championship began on 15 June 1996 and ended on 3 November 1996.

On 3 November 1996, Newtownshandrum won the championship after a 0-12 to 0-09 defeat of Cloyne in a final replay at Páirc Uí Chaoimh. It was their fourth championship title overall and their first title since 1981.

Newtownshandrum's Ben O'Connor was the championship's top scorer with 3-33.

Team changes

From Championship

Promoted to the Cork Senior Hurling Championship
 Kilbrittain

Regraded to the East Cork Junior A Hurling Championship
 Midleton

Regraded to the City Junior A Hurling Championship
 Blackrock

To Championship

Promoted from the Cork Junior Hurling Championship
 Killeagh

Results

First round

Second round

Quarter-finals

Semi-finals

Finals

Championship statistics

Top scorers

Overall

In a single game

References

Cork Intermediate Hurling Championship
Cork Intermediate Hurling Championship